= Ahmad Gul =

Ustad Ahmad Gul
- Born: 1942 (age 83–84); Peshawar, Khyber Pakhtunkhwa, Pakistan
- Occupation: Singer

Ustad Ahmad Gul (born 1942) is a Pakistani Pashto folk and ghazal singer.
